Bulbophyllum bliteum is a species of orchid in the genus Bulbophyllum. It is native to Papua New Guinea.

References

External links
The Bulbophyllum-Checklist
The Internet Orchid Species Photo Encyclopedia

bliteum
Plants described in 1993